Archduchess Hedwig of Austria (Hedwig Maria Immakulata Michaela Ignatia; 24 September 1896 in Bad Ischl – 1 November 1970 in Hall in Tirol) was the second daughter of Archduke Franz Salvator of Austria and his wife, Marie Valerie of Austria. She was a granddaughter of Emperor Franz Joseph I and Empress Elisabeth.

Biography
Hedwig was born on 24 September 1896 in Bad Ischl. Empress Elisabeth visited her daughter shortly after delivery. Her mother gave her the hunting lodge Kühtai in Austria, as a wedding gift in 1917, it having been acquired in 1893 by Emperor Franz Joseph and bequeathed to Marie Valerie.

Hedwig married on 24 April 1918 Count Bernhard of Stolberg-Stolberg (1881–1952), a son of Count Leopold of Stolberg-Stolberg and of Mary Eddington, a Scottish heiress, at the castle of Wallsee, owned by the bridegroom's father. The couple had nine children:

 Marie Elisabeth zu Stolberg-Stolberg (1919-2012)
 Franz Josef zu Stolberg-Stolberg (1920-1986)
Friedrich Leopold zu Stolberg-Stolberg (1921-2007)
Bernhard Friedrich Hubertus zu Stolberg-Stolberg (1922-1958)
Therese Maria Valerie zu Stolberg-Stolberg (1923-1982)
Carl Franz zu Stolberg-Stolberg (1925-2003)
Ferdinand Maria Immaculata zu Stolberg-Stolberg (1926-1998)
Anna Regina Emanuela Maria zu Stolberg-Stolberg (1927-2002)
Magdalena Maria Mathilde zu Stolberg-Stolberg (* 1930)

In 1949 Hedwig began to transform the castle into a ski lodge, subsequently opened to the public as Kühtai ski resort.

Hedwig died in 1970 with 74 years in Hall in Tyrol. She is buried in the family vault in the cemetery Hall.

Ancestry

References

1896 births
1970 deaths
Hedwig
Austrian princesses